Dolno Lisiče is a village in the municipality of Aerodrom, North Macedonia.

Demographics
As of the 2021 census, Dolno Lisiče had 2,627 residents with the following ethnic composition:
Macedonians 2,481
Persons for whom data are taken from administrative sources 80
Serbs 30
Others 28

According to the 2002 census, the village had a total of 2,440 inhabitants. Ethnic groups in the village include:
Macedonians 2,378
Serbs 47
Vlachs 1
Others 14

References

External links

Villages in Aerodrom Municipality, Skopje